Walled Lake Central High School is a public high school of the Walled Lake Consolidated Schools, located in Commerce Township, Michigan in Metro Detroit. It serves portions of the township, Wolverine Lake, a small portion of the City of Walled Lake, and a small portion of Wixom.  It was built as Walled Lake High School in 1957, and, a year after its first additions were completed in 1968, took its current name.  The original addition was part of a construction project that included construction of Walled Lake Western High School. More additions were completed in 1992 and 2000.

Marching band 
The Walled Lake Central Viking Marching Band was the 2010, 2011 and 2013 MCBA Flight I State Champion. The band also performed at the 89th Annual Macy’s Thanksgiving Day Parade.

Notable alumni 
 Dax Shepard, an actor and podcast host
 Justin Goltz, professional American football quarterback and collegiate baseball player 
 Adetokunbo Ogundeji, professional American football player for the NFL's Atlanta Falcons
 Kierra Sheard, American gospel singer

References

External links

 Walled Lake Central High School

Schools in Commerce Township, Michigan
Public high schools in Michigan
Educational institutions established in 1957
High schools in Oakland County, Michigan
1957 establishments in Michigan